Dark Age is a 2019 science fiction novel by American author Pierce Brown, the second book of a trilogy which continues the story of his Red Rising trilogy (2014–2016). Dark Age takes place immediately after the events of Iron Gold (2018), as the remaining Society forces aim to take back Mercury from the Solar Republic. A sequel, Light Bringer, will be released on July 25, 2023.

Plot 
Darrow and his legions are barricaded from all sides on Mercury from Society forces. Lysander and the Raa family meet Atalantia to broker an alliance between The Rim and The Core in order to defeat Darrow and give rise to a new Society. Lysander and his former friend Ajax au Grimmus participate in an Iron Rain against Darrow's armies, but Darrow fights back with a Storm God, a previously hidden terraforming tool used as a weapon. During the battle, Lysander loses an eye and his companion Seraphina is killed; Ajax betrays Lysander and leaves him to die in vengeance for Lysander's favorable position with the family as a child. Darrow kills his pilot Orion, who attempts to use the Storm God indiscriminately. Darrow's forces narrowly manage to win the battle by seizing control of Mercury's center of commerce Heliopolis with the arrival of the warship Morning Star.

Virginia struggles to keep her power as the Sovereign with her allies growing increasingly hostile due to her continued support for Darrow's agenda. She suspects treachery from her allies in the Forum, especially Publius. Having managed to locate Sevro, Virginia kidnaps the Duke of Hands and attempts to pry information on The Syndicate's Queen and the location of their missing children. On the day where Virginia is to give a speech to the Solar Republic giving one last plea of help to free Darrow, Sevro tracks down The Syndicate Queen on Earth. Virginia is betrayed when her closest allies are all poisoned and a mob kills her friend Daxo before kidnapping her. The Syndicate Queen arrives and is revealed to be Lilath, who has given birth to a now 10-year-old clone of Virginia's deceased brother Adrius 'The Jackal'. Virginia manages to poison Adrius and escapes, leaving Sevro and several Howlers behind with Lilath.

Ephraim, Pax and Electra are kidnapped by the Obsidians led by Sefi. Sefi hopes to lead the Obsidians into a new age and secure their freedom. They start by taking over several areas of Mars including Cimmeria. Sefi reveals to Ephraim that Volga, his former apprentice, is the last surviving daughter of Ragnar Volarus and is the heir to the Obsidian throne. Ephraim, feeling he has been reformed from his ways as a thief, refuses to help Sefi. In Olympia, Ephraim encounters a giant Obsidian named Volsung Fá, the ancient leader of a pirate tribe called the Ascomanni. When Sefi does not believe him, Ephraim and the children escape.

Lyria and Volga are imprisoned by Victra, but manage to break free of their captivity when the Ascomanni lay siege to their ship. They flee to Mars, where they discover that Victra has also survived and where Lyria gets a parasitical power called The Figment. Victra gives birth to a son, Ulysses. They are betrayed by the Red Hand, who kills Ulysses and kidnaps Victra and Volga. Lyria infiltrates a Red Hand slave trafficking ring and with the help of other girls kill their captors. Lyria rescues Victra and Volga, and they kill the Red Hand leader Harmony. Ephraim arrives on Mars after hearing a distress call from Lyria and is able to subdue the remaining Red Hand forces. After tearfully reuniting with Volga, Ephraim returns to Olympia to once again ask for Sefi's help; Fá arrives and claims that he is Sefi and Ragnar's father. After killing Sefi and those loyal to her, Fá reveals that he intends to find and indoctrinate Volga. Ephraim attempts to kill Fá with explosives but Fá survives and eats Ephraim's heart.

On Mercury, Lysander makes a deal with Atlas that involves the infiltration of Darrow's legions in Heliopolis. With the aid of a master maker named Glirastes, Lysander uses a massive widescale EMP charge to subdue all electronics in the area including the Morning Star. Darrow arrives to confront Lysander but finds his army overwhelmed when Lysander's army fights back atop a legion of thousands of horses. Darrow and the surviving members of his army narrowly escape with the arrival of Cassius au Bellona, who had been kept alive by the Raa family and managed to escape to Kavax.

In order to secure a Society-led future Lysander is forced into an engagement to Atalantia, who he previously discovered from the late Kalindora au San (The Love Knight) to have to arranged his parents' deaths. Virginia and Victra reunite with Pax and Electra. Lyria sets off to discover the secrets of the parasite in her brain while Volga leaves to confront Fá. Lysander makes a deal with Apollonius au Valii-Rath, the Minotaur, to lay siege to Mars.

Publication 
Brown announced a sequel trilogy to Red Rising in February 2016. The title of the second installment, Dark Age, was announced in February 2018 soon after the release of Iron Gold. Dark Age was released on July 30, 2019, and debuted at #4 on The New York Times Best Seller list.

References

External links
 

2019 American novels
2019 science fiction novels
American adventure novels
American science fiction novels
Dystopian novels
Classical mythology in popular culture
Fiction set on Jupiter's moons
Novels set on Mars
Novels about slavery
Novels by Pierce Brown
Fiction set on Phobos (moon)
Science fantasy novels
Works about women in war
Del Rey books